The Kuwaiti dinar (code: KWD) is the currency of Kuwait. It is sub-divided into 1,000 fils.

As of 2023, the Kuwaiti dinar is the currency with the highest value per base unit, with KD 1 equalling US$3.27, ahead of the Bahraini dinar with BD 1 equalling US$2.65.

History

The dinar was introduced in 1961 to replace the Gulf rupee, equal to the Indian rupee. It was initially equivalent to £1 sterling. As the rupee was fixed at 1/6d, that resulted in a conversion rate of Rs. to KD 1.

When Iraq invaded Kuwait in 1990, the Iraqi dinar replaced the Kuwaiti dinar as the currency and large quantities of banknotes were stolen by the invading forces. After liberation, the Kuwaiti dinar was restored as the country's currency and a new banknote series was introduced, allowing the previous notes, including those stolen, to be demonetized.

Coins
The coins in the following table were introduced in 1961. The design of all coins is similar and has not changed since they were first minted. On the obverse is a boom ship, with year of minting in both Islamic and Common Era in Arabic. The reverse contains the value in Arabic within a central circle with الكُوَيت (Arabic for The Kuwait) above and KUWAIT in English below.

Unlike many other Middle Eastern currencies, Kuwait has a coin worth 0.02 of its main currency unit rather than 0.025 or 0.25 - though this latter does exist as a banknote (see below).

The 1 fils coin was last minted in 2014.

Banknotes
Six series of the Kuwaiti dinar banknote have been printed.

First series
The first series was issued following the pronouncement of the Kuwaiti Currency Law in 1960, which established the Kuwaiti Currency Board. This series was in circulation from 1 April 1961 to 1 February 1982 and consisted of denominations of KD , KD , KD 1, KD 5 and KD 10.

Second series
After the creation of the Central Bank of Kuwait in 1969 as a replacement to the Kuwaiti Currency Board, new KD , KD  and KD 10 notes were issued from 17 November 1970, followed by the new KD 1 and KD 5 notes of the second series on 20 April 1971.  This second series was withdrawn on 1 February 1982.

Third series
The third series was issued on 20 February 1980, after the accession to the throne of late Emir Jaber Al-Ahmad Al-Sabah, in denominations of KD , KD , 1, 5 and KD 10. A KD 20 banknote was introduced later on 9 February 1986. As a result of the state of emergency after the Invasion of Kuwait, this series was ruled invalid with effect from 30 September 1991. Significant quantities of these notes were stolen by Iraqi forces and some had appeared on the international numismatic market. The "Standard Catalog of World Paper Money" (A. Pick, Krause Publications) lists notes with the following serial number prefix denominators as being among those stolen:

Fourth series
After the liberation, a fourth series was issued on 24 March 1991 with the aims of replacing the previous withdrawn series as quickly as possible and guaranteeing the country's swift economic recovery. This fourth series was legal tender until 16 February 1995. Denominations were KD , KD , KD 1, KD 5, KD 10 and KD 20.

Fifth series
The fifth series of Kuwaiti banknotes was in use from 3 April 1994  and included high-tech security measures which have now become standard for banknotes. It was withdrawn on 1 October 2015. Denominations were as in the fourth series.

Sixth series
Central Bank of Kuwait brought the sixth series of Kuwaiti banknotes into circulation on 29 June 2014. Some of the notes are coarse so that the blind can identify them by touch.

Commemorative issues
In both 1993 and 2001, the Central Bank of Kuwait issued commemorative KD 1 polymer banknotes to celebrate its Liberation from Iraq. The first commemorative note, dated 26 February 1993, was issued to celebrate the second anniversary of its Liberation. The front features the map of the State of Kuwait, the emblem of Kuwait and on the left and right side of the note is the list of nations that assisted in its Liberation, in both English and Arabic. The second commemorative note, dated 26 February 2001, was issued to celebrate the tenth anniversary of its Liberation. One feature from the note is an optically variable device (OVD) patch that shows a fingerprint, a reference to the victims of the invasion and occupation of Kuwait. Even though they were denominated as KD 1, both of the commemorative notes state that they were not legal tender.

From 18 March 1975 to 4 January 2003, the dinar was pegged to a weighted currency basket. From 5 January 2003 until 20 May 2007, the pegging was switched to US$1 = KD 0.29963 with margins of ±3.5%. The central rate translates to approximately KD 1 =  US$3.53

From 16 June 2007, the Kuwaiti dinar was re-pegged to a basket of currencies, and was worth about $3.28 as of December 2016. It is the world's highest-valued currency unit.

See also
 Kuwait
 Economy of Kuwait

References

 This article draws heavily on the corresponding article in the German Wikipedia, retrieved 2 March 2005.

External links

 Images and description of banknotes ( New Central Bank of Kuwait website ) 
 The banknotes of Kuwait 

Economy of Kuwait
Fixed exchange rate
Currencies introduced in 1961
Currencies of Kuwait